Bryan Clifford Maxwell (born September 7, 1955) is a Canadian former professional ice hockey player who played 331 games in the National Hockey League and 124 games in the World Hockey Association.  He played for the Cleveland Crusaders, Cincinnati Stingers, New England Whalers, Minnesota North Stars, St. Louis Blues, Winnipeg Jets, and Pittsburgh Penguins.

Maxwell was born in North Bay, Ontario. He is a former head coach of the ECHL hockey team, the Victoria Salmon Kings, out of Victoria, British Columbia.

Career statistics

Regular season and playoffs

International

Coaching statistics

Legend
† – Replaced midseason

Transactions
June, 1975 – Selected by the Cleveland Crusaders (WHA) in 1975 WHA Amateur Draft. 
June, 1976 – Transferred to the Minnesota Fighting Saints (WHA) after the Cleveland Crusaders (WHA) franchise relocated.
September, 1976 – Traded to the Cincinnati Stingers (WHA) by the Minnesota Fighting Saints (WHA) for John McKenzie and the rights to Ivan Hlinka.
May, 1977 – Traded to the New England Whalers (WHA) by the Cincinnati Stingers (WHA) with Greg Carroll for the rights to Mike Liut. 
February, 1978 – Signed as a free agent by the Minnesota North Stars after securing release from the New England Whalers (WHA).
June 10, 1979 – Traded to the St. Louis Blues by the Minnesota North Stars with Richie Hansen for St. Louis' 2nd round choice (later traded to the Calgary Flames who selected Dave Reierson) in 1982 NHL Entry Draft.
July 3, 1981 – Traded to the Winnipeg Jets by the St. Louis Blues with Paul MacLean and Ed Staniowski for Scott Campbell and John Markell.
October 13, 1983 – Claimed on waivers by the Pittsburgh Penguins from the Winnipeg Jets.

External links
 

1955 births
Living people
Baltimore Skipjacks players
Binghamton Dusters players
Canadian expatriate ice hockey players in the United States
Canadian ice hockey coaches
Canadian ice hockey defencemen
Cincinnati Stingers players
Cleveland Crusaders players
Ice hockey people from Ontario
Indianapolis Racers draft picks
Lethbridge Hurricanes coaches
Los Angeles Kings coaches
Medicine Hat Tigers coaches
Medicine Hat Tigers players
Minnesota North Stars draft picks
Minnesota North Stars players
National Hockey League first-round draft picks
New England Whalers players
Oklahoma City Stars players
Pittsburgh Penguins players
St. Louis Blues players
Salt Lake Golden Eagles (CHL) players
Spokane Chiefs coaches
Sportspeople from North Bay, Ontario
Springfield Indians players
Victoria Salmon Kings coaches
Winnipeg Jets (1979–1996) players
World Hockey Association first round draft picks